Nós  (meaning "custom" or "trend") is an Irish language culture and lifestyle magazine. 

Launched online on 17 March 2008 during Seachtain na Gaeilge, it began publishing a glossy print edition in November of the same year. Run on a voluntary basis, this full-colour monthly edition continued for over a year before Nós was printed as an entertainment supplement with Irish language weekly newspaper, Gaelscéal. In July 2013, Nós was relaunched with a new design and was circulated monthly, with extra content updated more frequently online.

The magazine covers topics such as music, film, travel, design, activism and current affairs. It was launched by Tomaí Ó Conghaile, former assistant editor of Lá Nua and television and radio presenter with BBC NI, and relies on a large network of contributors throughout Ireland and abroad.

Nós has received a number of awards for its contemporary design and content, including Best Irish Language Website at the Irish Web Awards in 2009.  It was also the first and only Irish language publication to be nominated at the Irish Magazine Awards. 

In January 2015 Nós launched a new website, updated daily with new content and is now solely available online.

Articles in the magazine are normally written in the Irish language, although a number of articles have also appeared in Scottish Gaelic and Manx. 

On 1 February 2018, the editorship of the magazine changed hands to Maitiú Ó Coimín.

See also
List of Irish-language media
List of Celtic-language media
Raidió Rí-Rá

References

External links 
Nós magazine website 

Magazines published in Ireland
Irish-language magazines
Magazines established in 2008
Monthly magazines published in Ireland
Cultural magazines